Dhanlaxmi Bank Ltd is an Indian private sector bank headquartered in Thrissur, Kerala. The bank has 245 branches and 258 ATMs/CDMs spread over the states of Kerala, Tamil Nadu, Karnataka, Andhra Pradesh, Telangana, Maharashtra, Gujarat, Delhi, West Bengal, Madhya Pradesh, Punjab, Uttar Pradesh, Rajasthan, Chandigarh, and Haryana.

History
It became a Scheduled Commercial Bank in the year 1977.

Business overview
•	Dhanlaxmi Bank has recorded an annual operating profit of Rs.134.30 Crs and Net profit of Rs.35.90 Crs for the financial year ended 31st March 2022. 
•	Total business of the Bank improved to Rs. 20847 Crs as on 31st March 2022 from Rs. 18834 Crs as on 31st March 2021, registering growth of 10.69%.
•	Deposits recorded a growth of 5.90 % to reach Rs.12403 Crs as on 31st March 2022 against Rs. 11712 Crs as on 31st March 2021. 
•	CASA deposits grew by 8.80% during the year and reached Rs.4252 Crs as on 31st March.2022 which was Rs.3908 Crs as on 31st March.2021. 
•	CASA to Total deposits as on 31st March.2022 improved to 34.28%.
•	Gross Advances reached Rs.8444 Crs as on 31st March 2022 from Rs. 7122 Crs as on 31st March 2021, registering growth of 18.56%.
•	Annual Net Interest Income increased from Rs.329.65 Crs  as on 31st March 2021 to Rs. 362.32 Crs, as on 31st March  2022 registering growth of 9.91%
•	Non-Interest income of the Bank increased to Rs. 169.12 Crs as on 31st March 2022 from Rs. 122.22 Crs as on 31st March 2021,   registering a growth of 38.37% . 
•	NIM improved from 2.82% to 3.00% on Y-o-Y basis
•	Total Income of the Bank increased by Rs.32.79 Crs with growth of 3.11% on Y-o-Y basis
•	Cost to Income Ratio reduced from 81.01% to 74.73% on Y-o-Y basis
•	CD Ratio improved from 60.81% to 68.08% on Y-o-Y basis.
•	Asset Quality improved significantly with Gross NPA coming down by 291 bps and Net NPA coming down by 191 bps on a Y-o-Y basis to 6.32% and 2.85% respectively.
•	Provision Coverage Ratio improved from 74.20% to 80.64% on Y-o-Y basis
•	Book Value of shares improved from Rs.34.15 to Rs.35.57 on Y-o-Y basis 
•	CRAR as on March 31, 2022 was 12.98%

Dhanlaxmi Bank has deployed Centralised Banking Solution (CBS) on the Flexcube platform at all its branches for extending anywhere/anytime/anyhow banking to its clientele through multiple delivery channels. The bank has set up a data centre in Bangalore, to keep the networked system operational round the clock.

Change of name
The bank has changed its name from Dhanalakshmi Bank to Dhanlaxmi Bank on 10 August 2010.

Partnerships
The bank is a depository participant of NSDL (National Security Depository Limited) offering Demat services through select branches. It has partnered AGS Infotech for installation of ATMs. It offers VISA & Rupay-branded debit cards and VISA branched credit cards to customers. It is also offering insurance services through Bajaj Allianz Life Insurance and CANARA HSBC OBC LIFE company as their Bancassurance life insurance channel partner and Bajaj Allianz General Insurance as General Insurance Channel Partner.

Credit cards
In March 2010, the bank launched Dhanlaxmi Bank Platinum and Gold Credit cards.

See also

 Banking in India
 List of banks in India
 Reserve Bank of India
 Indian Financial System Code
 List of largest banks
 List of companies of India
 Make in India
 Kerala Bank

References

External links
 

Banks established in 1927
Indian companies established in 1927
Banks based in Thrissur
Private sector banks in India
Companies listed on the National Stock Exchange of India
Companies listed on the Bombay Stock Exchange